The Aveyron is a  long river in France, a right tributary of the Loing.

The Aveyron flows into the Loing at Montbouy.

It crosses the following departments and communes:
Yonne: Champcevrais
Loiret: Le Charme, Saint-Maurice-sur-Aveyron, La Chapelle-sur-Aveyron, Montbouy

References

Rivers of France
Rivers of Bourgogne-Franche-Comté
Rivers of Centre-Val de Loire
Rivers of Yonne
Rivers of Loiret